John Hyatt Smith (April 10, 1824 – December 7, 1886) was a United States representative from New York.

Biography
Born in Saratoga, he was taught by his father and employed for a time as a clerk in Detroit and later as a bank clerk in Albany, New York; while in the latter position he studied theology. After ordination his first pastorate was in Poughkeepsie in 1848. He officiated in Cleveland, Ohio for three years, in Buffalo from 1855 to 1860, and in Philadelphia from 1860 to 1866. During the Civil War he served in Virginia with the United States Christian Commission in 1862, and was chaplain of the Forty-seventh Regiment, National Guard of New York, in 1869. He continued his ministerial duties in Brooklyn from 1866 to 1880, and was elected as an Independent candidate to the Forty-seventh Congress, holding office from March 4, 1881 to March 3, 1883. He appointed by President Chester A. Arthur a commissioner to inspect the Pacific Railroad, after which he resumed a pastorate in Brooklyn. He died there in 1886; interment was in Green-Wood Cemetery.

References

External links
 

1824 births
1886 deaths
People from Saratoga, New York
American Christian clergy
19th-century Christian clergy
Members of the United States House of Representatives from New York (state)
Burials at Green-Wood Cemetery
Union Army chaplains
New York (state) Independents
Independent members of the United States House of Representatives
19th-century American politicians
19th-century American clergy